Hilary Pecis (born 1979) is an American artist based in Los Angeles.

Pecis was raised in Redding, California close to the border with Oregon. She earned a BFA and MFA from California College of the Arts, in 2006 and 2009.

References

1979 births
American women artists
People from Redding, California
California College of the Arts alumni
Living people
21st-century American women